Elections to Eastleigh Council were held on 7 May 1998.  One third of the council was up for election and the Liberal Democrat party kept overall control of the council.

After the election, the composition of the council was
Liberal Democrat 29
Labour 8
Conservative 7

Election result

References 

1998
1998 English local elections
1990s in Hampshire